NBS (previously known as Natal Building Society) was one of the largest Independent banks in South Africa before it went through a series of mergers starting in 1998 to become part of Nedbank by 2004. It was headquartered in Durban.

History 
The Natal Building Society (NBS) was established as a building society in 1882.

In 1998, NBS merged with Boland Bank to form NBS Boland. The Managing Director at that time was John Graham Maxwell. In 1999, NBS Boland merged with B.o.E. Holdings Limited.  In 2002, B.o.E. Holdings Limited was merged with Nedcor.

In 2002, The NBS, Cashbank and PEP Bank divisions of BoE were incorporated into Peoples Bank, the subsidiary of Nedbank. and was fully integrated by 2004.

See also
List of banks in South Africa
Economy of South Africa
South African Reserve Bank

References

External links
 Website of Nedbank South Africa
 Ex-NBS employees on https://www.facebook.com/groups/4190212227/

Banks of South Africa
Banks established in 1882
Companies based in Durban
1882 establishments in the Colony of Natal